The 2021 Drydene 400 was a NASCAR Cup Series race that was held on May 16, 2021, at Dover International Speedway in Dover, Delaware. Contested over 400 laps on the 1-mile (1.6 km) concrete speedway, it was the 13th race of the 2021 NASCAR Cup Series season.

All of Hendrick Motorsports's cars finished in the top four with Alex Bowman taking the checkered flag, the first team to do so since Roush Racing at the 2005 Ford 400.

Entry list
 (R) denotes rookie driver.
 (i) denotes driver who are ineligible for series driver points.

Qualifying
Martin Truex Jr. was awarded the pole for the race as determined by competition-based formula.

Starting Lineup

Race

Martin Truex Jr. started on the pole. Kyle Larson dominated, leading the most laps and winning both stages. Aric Almirola got a flat tire and got into the wall before catching fire. Anthony Alfredo spun after contact with Brad Keselowski and collected Ricky Stenhouse Jr. Alex Bowman took the lead from the dominant Larson and pulled away for his second win of the season followed by teammates Larson, Chase Elliott and William Byron, making Hendrick the first team since Roush-Fenway Racing to have all four cars finish 1, 2, 3, 4.

Stage Results

Stage One
Laps: 120

Stage Two
Laps: 120

Final Stage Results

Stage Three
Laps: 160

Race statistics
 Lead changes: 10 among 5 different drivers
 Cautions/Laps: 7 for 41
 Red flags: 0
 Time of race: 3 hours, 19 minutes and 55 seconds
 Average speed:

Media

Television
Fox Sports covered the race on the television side. Mike Joy, five-time Dover winner Jeff Gordon and Clint Bowyer called the race from the broadcast booth. Jamie Little and Regan Smith handled pit road for the television side. Larry McReynolds provided insight from the Fox Sports studio in Charlotte.

Radio
MRN had the radio call for the race and was also simulcasted on Sirius XM NASCAR Radio.

Standings after the race

Drivers' Championship standings

Manufacturers' Championship standings

Note: Only the first 16 positions are included for the driver standings.
. – Driver has clinched a position in the NASCAR Cup Series playoffs.

References

Drydene 400
Drydene 400
NASCAR races at Dover Motor Speedway
Drydene 400